Andrew James McCosh (March 15, 1858 – December 2, 1908) was a distinguished surgeon in New York City.

Early years
A. J. McCosh was born on March 15, 1858, in Belfast, Ireland; the son of Scottish philosopher James McCosh. He attended Princeton University, where he was a college football player; captain of the 1876 team.

References

External links

1858 births
1908 deaths
Sportspeople from Belfast
American surgeons
19th-century players of American football
American football running backs
Princeton Tigers football players
Irish players of American football
Physicians from New York City
Irish emigrants to the United States (before 1923)
American people of Scottish descent
Irish people of Scottish descent